In Greek mythology, Epipole was a daughter of Trachion, of Carystus in Euboea. In the disguise of a man she went with the Greeks against Troy, but when Palamedes discovered her sex, she was stoned to death by the Greek army.

Her story was related by Ptolemaeus Chennus, as quoted by Photios in his Bibliotheca (cod. 190).

Notes

Achaeans (Homer)
Women of the Trojan war
Euboean characters in Greek mythology
Female wartime cross-dressers
People executed by stoning